Prumnopitys andina, the lleuque or Chilean plum yew, is an evergreen coniferous tree native to south-central Chile and a few areas in adjacent parts of westernmost Argentina from 36 to 40° South latitude.

The leaves are linear to sickle-shaped, 15–30 mm long and 2 mm broad. The seed cones are highly modified, reducing to a central stem 2–4 cm long bearing 1-4 scales, each scale maturing berry-like, oval, 10–15 mm long and 10 mm broad, green maturing dark purple, with a soft edible pulp covering the single seed. The seeds are dispersed by birds, which eat the 'berries' and pass the seeds in their droppings. Seeds are very difficult to germinate. It has a straight and cylindrical trunk, with gray and shiny bark.

Before the genus Prumnopitys was distinguished, it was treated in the related genus Podocarpus as Podocarpus andinus. It has also been treated by some botanists as Prumnopitys spicata (Molloy & Muñoz-Schick 1999); however this name is illegitimate (Mill & Quinn 2001). Prumnopitys elegans (Phil) is a synonym for Prumnopitys andina.

The tree is also occasionally grown as an ornamental tree and a hedge in oceanic climate areas in northwest Europe and the Pacific Northwest of North America. In these areas, it is also sometimes known as "plum-yew" or "plum-fruited yew", though these names are more commonly applied to plants in the genus Cephalotaxus.

The wood is a yellowish color and has a good quality. It is used in furniture and construction.

Evidence suggests that very little regeneration is occurring to replace current ageing trees in populations. In 2007, the Forestry Commission planted large numbers of young trees at Bedgebury Pinetum in the UK as part of a project aiming to conserve the genetic resources of endangered conifers.

References

Donoso, C. 2005. Árboles nativos de Chile. Guía de reconocimiento. Edición 4. Marisa Cuneo Ediciones, Valdivia, Chile. 136p.
Hechenleitner, P., M. Gardner, P. Thomas, C. Echeverría, B. Escobar, P. Brownless y C. Martínez. 2005. Plantas Amenazadas del Centro-Sur de Chile. Distribución, Conservación y Propagación. Universidad Austral de Chile y Real Jardín Botánico de Edimburgo, Valdivia. 188p.
Hoffman, Adriana 1982. Flora silvestre de Chile, Zona Araucana. Edición 4. Fundación Claudio Gay, Santiago. 258p.
Rodríguez, R. y M. Quezada. 1995. Gymnospermae. En C. Marticorena y R. Rodríguez [eds.], Flora de Chile Vol. 1, p 310–337. Universidad de Concepción, Concepción.
Bean. W. Trees and Shrubs Hardy in Great Britain. Vol 1 - 4 and Supplement. Murray 1981.
Huxley. A. 1992. The New RHS Dictionary of Gardening. MacMillan Press 1992

External links

 
 Molloy, B. P. J. & Muñoz-Schick, M. 1999. The correct name for the Chilean conifer Lleuque (Podocarpaceae). New Zealand J. Bot. 37: 189–193. Available online (pdf file).
 Mill, R. R. & Quinn, C. J. 2001. Prumnopitys andina reinstated as the correct name for ‘lleuque’, the Chilean conifer recently renamed P. spicata (Podocarpaceae). Taxon 50: 1143 - 1154. **** Abstract.

andina
Trees of Chile
Trees of Argentina
Trees of mild maritime climate
Ornamental trees
Vulnerable plants